Lithuanian Speed Skating Association is a national governing body of short track speed skating and speed skating sports in Lithuania.

References

External links 
Official website

Speed Skating
1997 establishments in Lithuania
Sports organizations established in 1997
National governing bodies for ice skating
Speed skating in Lithuania